Jovan Manev (born 25 January 2001) is a Macedonian professional footballer who plays as a centre-back for Adana Demirspor.

Career
Manev is a youth product of the academies of Osogovo and Bregalnica Štip, and began his career in North Macedonia with Bregalnica Štip in the 2021–22 season, making 30 appearances and scoring 2 goals in his debut season. On 3 July 2022, he signed with the Turkish club Adana Demirspor on loan for the 2022–23 season with an option to buy.

International career
Manev is a youth international for North Macedonia, having played for the North Macedonia U21s.

References

External links
 
 
 

2001 births
Living people
People from Kočani
Macedonian footballers
North Macedonia youth international footballers
Adana Demirspor footballers
FK Bregalnica Štip players
Macedonian First Football League players
Association football defenders
Macedonian expatriate footballers
Macedonian expatriate sportspeople in Turkey
Expatriate footballers in Turkey